NGC 6822 (also known as Barnard's Galaxy, IC 4895, or Caldwell 57) is a barred irregular galaxy approximately 1.6 million light-years away in the constellation Sagittarius.  Part of the Local Group of galaxies, it was discovered by E. E. Barnard in 1884 (hence its name), with a six-inch refractor telescope.  It is the closest non-satellite galaxy to the Milky Way, but lies just outside its virial radius.  It is similar in structure and composition to the Small Magellanic Cloud. It is about 7,000 light-years in diameter.

Observational history 
NGC 6822 was discovered by E. E. Barnard in 1884 using a six-inch refractor telescope.

Edwin Hubble, in the paper N.G.C. 6822, A Remote Stellar System, identified 15 variable stars (11 of which were Cepheids) of this galaxy.  He also surveyed the galaxy's stars distribution down to magnitude 19.4.  He provided spectral characteristics, luminosities and dimensions for the five brightest "diffuse nebulae" (giant H II regions) that included the Bubble Nebula and the Ring Nebula.  He also computed the absolute magnitude of the entire galaxy.

Hubble's detection of eleven Cepheid variable stars was a milestone in astronomy. This was the first system beyond the Magellanic Clouds to have its distance determined. (Hubble continued this process with the Andromeda Galaxy and the Triangulum Galaxy). His distance to the galaxy was way beyond Harlow Shapley's value of 300,000 light-years for the size of the universe. In the paper, Hubble concluded the "Great Debate" of 1920 between Heber Curtis and Shapley over the scale of the universe and the nature of the "spiral nebula". It soon became evident that all spiral nebulae were in fact spiral galaxies far outside our own Milky Way.

An analysis of Hubble's plates by Susan Kayser in 1966 remained the most complete study of this galaxy until 2002.

In 1977, Paul W. Hodge extended the list of known H II regions in Barnard to 16.  Today, there are over 150 of these regions catalogued in Barnard's Galaxy.

Star formation
Observations of the galaxy show stars-forming in the dense cores of giant clouds of molecular hydrogen gas, cold enough to collapse under its own gravity. The distribution of hydrogen gas is disk-shaped, but mysteriously, it is angled at about 60° relative to the stellar distribution. Most of its stars formed within the last 3 to 5 billion years.

NGC 6822 has spent most of its life in relative isolation. However, it likely passed within the virial radius of the Milky Way some 3 to 4 billion years ago, which may be coincident with its increase in star formation.

See also
 Bubble Nebula (NGC 6822)
 Ring Nebula (NGC 6822)
 Large Magellanic Cloud - another irregular galaxy within the Local Group
 Small Magellanic Cloud - another irregular galaxy within the Local Group

Notes

Sources 

 
 
 
 
 Robert Burnham, Jr, Burnham's Celestial Handbook: An observer's guide to the universe beyond the solar system, vol 3, p. 1559

External links

 The Milky Way's Tiny but Tough Galactic Neighbour — ESO Press Release
 NGC 6822: Barnard's Galaxy 
 
 SEDS – NGC 6822

 
Barred irregular galaxies
Local Group
Sagittarius (constellation)
6822
4895
063616
057b
18840817